First-seeded Esna Boyd defeated Sylvia Harper 5–7, 6–1, 6–2, in the final to win the women's singles tennis title at the 1927 Australian Championships (Tennis).

Seeds
The seeded players are listed below. Esna Boyd is the champion; others show the round in which they were eliminated.

 Esna Boyd (champion)
 Daphne Akhurst (second round)
 Sylvia Harper (finalist)
 Louie Bickerton (semifinals)
 Gladys Toyne (second round)
 Marjorie Cox (quarterfinals)
 Kathleen Le Messurier (quarterfinals)
 Minnie Richardson (second round)

Draw

Key
 Q = Qualifier
 WC = Wild card
 LL = Lucky loser
 r = Retired

Finals

Earlier rounds

Section 1

Section 2

Notes
 Weston vs. De Bavay: some sources give 6–3, 3–6, 6–4.
 Cox vs. Anthony: some sources give 3–6, 6–3, 6–3.

External links
 
  Source for seedings

1927 in women's tennis
Women's Singles
1927 in Australian women's sport